Brandon Michael Hyde (born October 3, 1973) is an American professional baseball manager for the Baltimore Orioles of Major League Baseball (MLB). Hyde had previously served as the bench coach, director of player development, and first base coach for the Chicago Cubs, and as a bench coach and interim manager for the Florida Marlins.

Playing career
Hyde graduated from Montgomery High School in Santa Rosa, California, in 1992. He attended Santa Rosa Junior College and California State University, Long Beach, and played college baseball for the Long Beach State Dirtbags.

Hyde signed with the Chicago White Sox as an undrafted free agent in 1997. He played in the White Sox organization through 2000, reaching the Charlotte Knights of the Class AAA International League. In 2001, he played for the Chico Heat of the Western Baseball League, an independent baseball league. Over the course of his minor league career, he played in 200 games and hit .252 with 15 home runs.

Coaching career

Florida Marlins
Hyde managed in the Marlins organization from 2005 to 2009, heading the Greensboro Grasshoppers in 2005 and 2006, the Carolina Mudcats in 2007, the Jupiter Hammerheads in 2008 and the Jacksonville Suns in 2009 where he led the Suns to their fourth Southern League Championship in club history. He had also spent two years as the Grasshoppers' hitting coach. In 2010, he was the Marlins minor league infield coordinator.

On June 23, 2010, the Marlins fired manager Fredi González, bench coach Carlos Tosca, and hitting coach Jim Presley. Hyde was named the interim bench coach, Edwin Rodríguez was named the interim manager, and John Mallee was named the hitting coach. On November 3, 2010, the Marlins removed the interim tags from each, and made Hyde their bench coach for the 2011 season.

When Rodríguez unexpectedly resigned on June 19, 2011, Hyde was named acting manager for that evening's game against the Tampa Bay Rays (a 2–1 loss that brought the team's losing streak to ten games). On June 20, Jack McKeon was named Interim Manager and Hyde moved back to the bench coach position.

Chicago Cubs
On November 22, 2013, Hyde was named bench coach of the Chicago Cubs, under new manager Rick Renteria. The Cubs made a managerial change prior to the 2015 season, firing Renteria and hiring Joe Maddon. Maddon brought Dave Martinez to the Cubs from the Tampa Bay Rays to be his bench coach, and moved Hyde to first base coach. During the 2017–18 off-season, Hyde rejected an offer by the New York Mets to join their coaching staff and remained with the Cubs after they promoted him to bench coach; Martinez had been hired as the Washington Nationals' manager.

On June 23, 2018, Hyde was ejected in the fourth inning against the Cincinnati Reds. This was the first ejection of his career.

Managerial career

Baltimore Orioles
On December 14, 2018, the Baltimore Orioles named Hyde their new manager. On April 15, 2019, Hyde received his first career managerial ejection after arguing a slide rule call against the Boston Red Sox. In 2019, Hyde managed the Orioles to a  record, the second worst record in the league, second to only the Detroit Tigers. In the 60-game abbreviated 2020 season, Hyde and the Orioles finished , fourth in the division ahead of the Boston Red Sox. In 2020, he had his players attempt sacrifice bunts at a higher rate than any other major league manager. The Orioles finished the 2021 season with a  record.

In 2022, Hyde lead the Orioles to a  record, a 31-game improvement from the previous year. Hyde finished second in AL Manager of the Year voting, losing to Terry Francona of the Cleveland Guardians.

Managerial record

References

External links

1973 births
Living people
Baseball players from California
Birmingham Barons players
Bristol White Sox players
Burlington Bees players
Charlotte Knights players
Chicago Cubs coaches
Chicago Cubs executives
Chico Heat players
Florida Marlins coaches
Florida Marlins managers
Gulf Coast White Sox players
Long Beach State Dirtbags baseball players
Major League Baseball bench coaches
Major League Baseball farm directors
Baltimore Orioles managers
Sportspeople from Santa Rosa, California
Winston-Salem Warthogs players
Santa Rosa Bear Cubs baseball players